Alexander Skinner may refer to:

 Al Skinner (baseball) (1856–1901), Major League Baseball player
 Alexander Skinner (politician) (1910–1968), member of the Queensland Legislative Assembly
 Xander Skinner (born 1998), Namibian swimmer